The Ministry of Finance is the Andorran government ministry in charge of public finances of Andorra. The ministry is located in Prat de la Creu, 62-64, Andorra la Vella.

Ministers of Finance
Jaume Bartumeu Cassany, January 1990 - May 1992
Josep Casal Casal, May 1992 - December 1994
Susagna Arasanz Serra, December 1994 - April 2001
Mireia Maestre Cortadella, April 2001 - June 2005
Ferran Mirapeix Lucas June 2005 - June 2009
Pere López Agràs, June 2009 - May 2011
Jordi Cinca Mateos, May 2011 - May 2019
Èric Jover, May 2019 -

See also
 Executive Council of Andorra
 Economy of Andorra

External links
 Ministry website

References 

Finance
Andorra
Government of Andorra
Economy of Andorra
Andorra la Vella